Jack Lewis (born October 1980 in New York City, New York) is an American musician and artist. He was born and raised on the Lower East Side of Manhattan.  He is the younger brother of Jeffrey Lewis, whom he has often performed and recorded with.  Jack Lewis is now based in Portland, Oregon

Biography
Lewis is a 1998 graduate of LaGuardia High School, where he focused on the visual arts. He went on to graduate from Bard College with a degree in visual arts in June, 2002. After graduating he worked at the Museum of Modern Art for the video curator Barbara London and Sally Berger.

Musical career
Lewis self-released L'vov's Lament under the name "Lesser Lewis" in 2002.

He has written and performed on songs for Jeffrey Lewis's albums It's The Ones Who've Cracked That The Light Shines Through in 2003,  and 'Em Are I (2008).

Lewis released L'vov Reads His Notes in 2005 (featuring Herman Dune) and L'vov Goes To Emandee with My UNICEF Box in 2007 under the name: Jack Lewis and the Cutoffs. In 2007, he did a Take-Away Show.

The Bundles, a band featuring Kimya Dawson, Karl Blau, Anders Griffen, and Jeffrey Lewis and Jack Lewis, released their first album in March 2010 on K Records.

Discography
 Hero Worship and the Animals We Love (7 inch EP) - as Jack "Laissezfaire" Lewis
 City and Eastern Songs (2005), Rough Trade - Jeffrey and Jack Lewis
 L'vov's Lament - as Jack "Laissezfaire" Lewis (with Ben Dope, Gottesman and Guitar Situations)
 L'vov Reads His Notes - as Jack Lewis and the Cutoffs
 L'vov Goes To Emandee with My Unicef Box- as Jack Lewis and the Cutoffs

References

External links
 https://web.archive.org/web/20100108044610/http://www.krecs.com/html/artists/artistbio.php?interest=180
 http://www.askart.com/askart/l/jack_lewis/jack_lewis.aspx
 https://www.nytimes.com/2011/11/23/arts/music/jeffrey-lewis-singer-and-illustrator.html
 https://www.dongiovannirecords.com/

1980 births
Living people
Songwriters from New York (state)
Bard College alumni
21st-century American singers
21st-century American male singers
American male songwriters
The Bundles members